Kim Yeong-cheol (born February 25, 1953) is a South Korean actor. One of his earliest appearances was in White Smile (1981). Other notable roles include playing Gung Ye in Emperor Wang Gun (2000-2002), a gangster boss in A Bittersweet Life (2005), and a NSS deputy director in IRIS (2009).

Filmography

Television

Film

Television shows

Awards and nominations

State honors

Notes

See also 
 Cinema of Korea

References

External links 

 
 
 

South Korean male television actors
South Korean male film actors
1953 births
Living people